Rudny (Kazakh Рудный, Rudnyi) a city on the Tobol River in Kostanay Region of Kazakhstan. It appeared in 1957 in connection with the development of iron ore deposits, the construction Sokolovsko-Sarbai mining, and processing enterprise. Population: 

On August 30, 1957, by a resolution of the Presidium of the Supreme Council of the Kazakh SSR, the village of builders SSGOK Rudny was transformed into a city with the preservation of the name - Rudny.

Name
Originally, "Ore" - the name of the village builders trust "Sokolovrudstroy".

Later, the miners began to call him - Rudnogorsk.

After building the tent city was invited to be called - Semidesyatipalatinsk.

In official documents the name of the village has changed many times.

It is believed that the final name set fourteenth issue of the magazine Ogonyok in 1955. In the published essay was written:

 This city was called Rudny and this is his final title.
It is difficult to tell what is the name of any locality: usually something very characteristic of him; rarely intervenes in case. Our city fell and both. Here's how this relates first chief engineer of the trust «Sokolovrudstroy» B.I.Buresh: «Village, which construction began on the site of the future city, we're the builders, called Ore». And so began to write in all documents. Kombinatovskiye same comrades, too, by themselves, called it «Rudnogorsk», and also refers in their papers. In the first half of 1955, the Director of the enterprise under construction - so called then combine - N.F.Sandrigailo and our Manager of the trust Ya.M.Gimmel'fard about a month and four were in Moscow and Alma-ATA for construction of the plant and the city. For them there were we - chief engineers. Prepare used a common letter in some instance, put the date and address «town of Rudny, Kustanay region»; suffered the signature of the chief engineer SSGOK`s Kandely. Not zacherknet «Rudny Village» and will write his - «Village Rudnogorsk» and always say: «So shall it be more optimistic!»
When a paper prepared Kombinatovcy, trevtovcy зачеркивали Village Rudnogorsk» and wrote «the Village of Ore». The builders of this name seemed more original and significant: for the sake of ore, in fact, started and all this grandiose construction».
It is difficult to say how long did this «war», if not for the arrival on the scene of a special correspondent of the magazine «Ogonek» В.М.Полынина. He visited the quarry of the settlement of geologists Pavlovsky and Komsomolsky, in detail got acquainted with construction SSgOK`s and the beginning of construction of the city, spent a lot of time with the first builders...
Article В.М.Полынина appeared in the fourteenth issue of the «Ogonyok» (1955.) called «new Settlers Ore». It drew a line under the «war» on the choice of the name. In the article there are such words: «The city is not on the map, it is not even registered in the official lists, it has no name, but pioneers of a new Magnitogorsk consider, that the best name for him - the city of Ore!»
So with a light hand Полынина and flew to the construction site letters from all over the Soviet Union, on which stood address - the city of Rudny! When they began to prepare documents for new buildings the status of a working settlement, the dispute is resumed. Just at this time N.F.Sandragailo was summoned to the Director of the Magnitogorsk plant. Already going on the road, he gave last instructions and tips. And suddenly asked: «How did we call the working settlement? Perhaps then will be called and the city!»
But he already gave the name and status of the city - Ore. From across the country are falling letters in our city. Goes, the people have already decided the question what the us over him thinking, " said В.К.Лютиков, one of the first seven employees SSGOK`s, head of the planning Department.
- Well! said N.F.Sandrigailo, Decided, decided so. And we will offer obliskolkomy and the Supreme Council of Kazakhstan». This proposal of the Presidium of the Supreme Council of the Kazakh SSR supported and in August 1956, issued a Decree, which said that referred to the category of working settlements town during the construction of the Sokolov-Sarbai mining and processing plant of Kostanay district, Kostanai oblast, giving it the name «working settlement Ore». Make a hell of a working village of Rudny town Komsomolsky».

Climate
The climate is continental, with a pronounced alternation of four seasons. In winter, during the week the temperature reaches the mark of minus 25-40 °C. Summer for two weeks to 30 °C.

Ethnic Groups

History
18 February 1949 pilot Mikhail Grigorievich Surgutanov, flying over the natural boundary of «Sarbay locality» drew attention to the strange behavior of the compass. After a few months to magnetic anomaly profit geologists and geographers. So was opened Sokolovskoe Deposit of iron ores. The discovery and study of the field is attributed to the geologist B. N. Nosikov.
In the summer of 1954, the government decided about the beginning of construction of the mill and the city.
In May 1955 the profit of the first builders. Operating trust was Ya. M. Gimmel'marsh and chief engineer Century W. Buresh. Miners, geologists and builders of the first time were placed in the village of Komsomolsk. Additionally tents were installed and constructed temporary prefabricated panel houses.
Already in 1955, the Komsomol profits for Big Turgai first 4 thousand people. The biggest tent town was in the cinema «Komsomol». Other camps were in place 39 quarter, near the village of Komsomolsky, in the area of the bakery, settlers lived more than 200 tents for 20 people each. Tent camps had their streets whose names speak for themselves and that is still present in the city: Construction, Pionerskaya, Komsomolskaya, Ukrainian, Kiev and others.
Future city was laid in 3 kilometers from Alekseyevka. The first General plan was developed in 1953 and was intended to 22 thousand people. But in 1954 this plan was revised, the population increased to 30 thousand people.
In the summer of 1956 the Presidium of the Supreme Council of Kazakh USSR decided to give Ore status of a working settlement. Also in the line of working settlement was submitted to the town Komsomolsk.
30 August 1957 working settlement turned into a city of regional subordination.
Over time, Rudniy city grew into a major industrial and cultural center of Kostanai region of the Republic of Kazakhstan.
Volume of industrial production for 12 months of 2009 amounted to 145,6 billion tenge, or 76.1% of the fact of last year, due mainly from the decrease in the world prices for steel products.
During the reporting period the volume of production of the main enterprise of JSC «SSGPO» amounted to KZT 128.3 billion tenge.
Plant «Kazogneypor», «Transremvagon», LLP «Leader-2» - production of alcohol products, the firm «Arasan» - soft drinks, «Sarybay», «Irgiz», plant of metal structures «Imstalkon», «DOK-furniture», «Tannery.
In 2008 in Rudny mosque was opened in the construction of which took part the best architects and artists of Kazakhstan and Russia, and in January 2012, in Ore opened the Cathedral of St. John the theologian.

Sport
The city represented Kostanay Region at the bandy tournament of the second Kazakhstani Youth Winter Games.

References

Populated places in Kostanay Region
Populated places established in 1955
1955 establishments in the Kazakh Soviet Socialist Republic